William Drew may refer to:

William Leworthy Goode Drew (1826–1898), English-born auditor-general in colonial Queensland
 William Henry Drew (Christian missionary) ( 1840), Christian missionary in India, and translator
 William Henry Drew (textile worker) (1854–1933), British textile worker, trade unionist and politician
Bill Drew (1890–1955), Australian rules footballer
William Brooks Drew (1908–1997), American botanist and professor